Sloane House may refer to:
Sloane House, Chelsea, a house in London, England
W. B. Sloane House, Elmhurst, Illinois, United States an early house having a designed carport, designed by Walter Burley Griffin
Merestead, also known as Sloane Estate, in Mamaroneck, New York, United States, NRHP-listed
Sloane House YMCA, New York, New York, United States, historic YMCA on West 34th Street
Rush R. Sloane House, Sandusky, Ohio, United States, listed on the NRHP in Sandusky, Ohio

See also
Sloan House (disambiguation)